Southern Telecom is a Svyazinvest company providing coverage to the Southern Federal District of Russia.  The company was formed in 2001 by the merger of 9 large telecommunications companies into the extant Kubanelectrosvyaz OJSC in Krasnodar:

 Electrosvyaz of the Adygea OJSC
 Svyazinform of the Astrakhan Region OJSC
 Volgogradelectrosvyaz OJSC - Volgograd region
 KabBalktelecom OJSC - Kabardino-Balkaria
 Electrosvyaz of the Kalmykia Republic OJSC
 Karachaevo-Cherkesskelectrosvyaz OJSC - Karachay–Cherkessia
 Rostovelectrosvyaz OJSC - Rostov Oblast
 Sevosetinelectrosvyaz OJSC
 Electrosvyaz of Stavropol Territory OJSC

The company's area of responsibility has a population of over 18 million people.

Southern Telecom's stock trades on the RTS, MICEX, Nasdaq, Frankfurt, Berlin and Vienna stock exchanges.

External links
 Southern Telecom - Russian language and English language
 Svyazinvest - Russian language and English language

Cable television companies of Russia
Companies based in Krasnodar
Companies formerly listed on the Moscow Exchange
Defunct companies of Russia
Svyazinvest